The DC Youth Orchestra Program (DCYOP) is an ensemble-based music education program in Washington, D.C. Founded in 1960 on the request of DC Public Schools to be the city's youth orchestra, DCYOP enrolls over 600 students ages 4–18 every year from the DC metro area. 

DCYOP serves as a model for the community, uniting students from different backgrounds with a shared passion, and is the District's only PreK-12 program that seeks to make high-quality, ensemble-based music education available to all students, regardless of socioeconomic status or ability. All students who are interested in learning a musical instrument are accepted into the program and tuition assistance is offered on a sliding scale so that the program is affordable and accessible to every family. In addition, to further remove barriers to music participation for at-risk students, DCYOP offers tuition-free Children's Orchestra programming on-site at three Title I DC public elementary schools. DCYOP also offers a two-week Summer Chamber Music Intensive and one-week Summer Orchestra Intensive.

DCYOP's proprietary curriculum introduces beginning musicians, who choose from 16 instruments to instrumental group lessons. These students work with DCYOP teaching artists one hour each week to learn a musical instrument. More experienced musicians are evaluated and then placed into one of our 10 ensembles: our introductory Premier Winds (wind, brass, and percussion) and Debut Strings; beginner Wind Ensemble (wind, brass, and percussion), Concertino Strings, and Sinfonia Strings;  intermediate Young Artists Orchestra (strings) and Repertory Orchestra (full instrumentation); and advanced Youth Philharmonic (full instrumentation), Young Virtuosi (chamber orchestra), and our renowned Youth Orchestra (full instrumentation). Each ensemble meets one to three hours weekly for sectionals and rehearsals. DCYOP also offers a tuition-free chamber music program for intermediate and advanced students.

DCYOP graduates enjoy successful careers across many disciplines. Alumni are professional musicians in the National Symphony Orchestra and other orchestras, Grammy and Emmy Award winners, New York Times best-selling authors, CEOs, cancer surgeons, Broadway stars, "Saturday Night Live" cast members, and civic leaders including DC Mayor Muriel Bowser. Many alumni point to DCYOP as a significant factor in their success.

DCYOP's Executive Director is Elizabeth Schurgin. Evan Ross Solomon serves as Artistic Director.

History
 1960 – DCYOP was founded by Lyn McLain at the request of DC Public Schools, with a handful of teachers and 60 students, at Roosevelt High School
 1961 – DCYOP's first season begins at Calvin Coolidge Senior High School
 2006 – Founder Lyn McLain retires
 2010 – DCYOP celebrates its 50th anniversary
 2010 – DCYOP relocates to Eastern Senior High School
 2019 – DCYOP relocates to Takoma Education Campus

International tours 
 1970 – Switzerland
 1972 – Germany
 1974 – Scotland and London
 1978 – Japan
 1981 – Greece and Yugoslavia
 1984 – Puerto Rico
 1986 – China, Hong Kong, and Taiwan
 1987 – Puerto Rico and South Korea
 1988 – Puerto Rico, Russia, and Estonia
 1989 – Spain
 1992 – Spain
 1994 – Netherlands, France, and Belgium
 1996 – Netherlands and Belgium
 1999 – Austria and Germany
 2002 – South Africa
 2003 – Japan
 2014 – Colombia
 2016 – Chile
 2018 – Italy

References

External links
 DC Youth Orchestra Program (website)

American youth orchestras
Music education in the United States
Music organizations based in the United States
Music schools in Washington, D.C.
Music of Washington, D.C.
Educational institutions established in 1960
1960 establishments in Washington, D.C.